

The BMW V was a six-cylinder, water-cooled inline aircraft engine built in Germany in the 1920s, with power of  for the production version, the BMW Va.

Specifications (BMW Va)

Applications
 Albatros L 73
 Albatros L 75
 Rohrbach Ro VII Robbe II

References

Bibliography

BMW aircraft engines
1920s aircraft piston engines